Carex physodes is a species of true sedge (family Cyperaceae), native to southern Russia, the northern Caucasus, Central Asia, Iran, Afghanistan, Pakistan, and Xinjiang in China. It is a spring ephemeral.

References

physodes
Flora of South European Russia
Flora of the North Caucasus
Flora of Central Asia
Flora of Iran
Flora of Afghanistan
Flora of Pakistan
Flora of Xinjiang
Plants described in 1809